

Final table

External links
RSSSF on PSL 01/02

2001-02
2001–02 in African association football leagues
2001–02 in South African soccer